GML Heritage is an Australian consultancy firm established in 1989 as Godden Mackay Pty Ltd and then Godden Mackay Logan Pty Ltd after its three main founders. The company specialises in the areas of heritage advice, historical and Aboriginal archaeology, and interpretation of heritage places.

There are offices in Sydney, Melbourne and Canberra and a team of over sixty industry leaders and experienced professionals in heritage, urban planning, archaeology, architecture, public history and interpretation. Services include Aboriginal heritage, built heritage, archaeology, landscape heritage, history, community engagement, climate heritage and interpretation and design.

Over 30 years, GML Heritage has delivered more than 7000 heritage projects in Australia and internationally. GML has undertaken work at Angkor Wat, Mawson's Huts in Antarctica, Lake Mungo National Park and the Sydney Opera House. It was involved in major archaeological excavations at the Little Lon district and the Royal Exhibition Building in Melbourne, as well as extensive archaeological work in Sydney's Rocks district.

The company has won numerous industry awards for its heritage advice and services.

References

External links 
 

Cultural heritage consultants
Companies established in 1989
Companies based in Sydney
Privately held companies of Australia
1989 establishments in Australia